Pojény is the Hungarian name for two villages in Romania:

 Poienile Zagrei village, Zagra Commune, Bistriţa-Năsăud County
 Poieni village, Densuş Commune, Hunedoara County